Chadian literature has suffered greatly from the turmoil which has engulfed the country, economical and political. As with many cultures, literature in Chad began with folk tales and legends. While French is the dominant language, Arabic is also used by some Chadian writers. Chadian literature is more prevalent in France than in Chad itself, due to market demand and the repressive culture present in Chad.

Chad's only literary critic, Ahmat Taboye, wrote Anthologie de la littérature tchadienne in 2003 to spread knowledge of Chadian literature. Though there are not very many well-known Chadian writers, there are a few, including Joseph Brahim Seïd, Baba Moustapha, Antoine Bangui and Koulsy Lamko.

See also
Culture of Chad
List of Chad-related topics

References

External links
Virtual Chad